Tej Singh is a 19th-century Dogra commander in Sikh Empire.

Tej Singh may also refer to:

 Desingh, also known as Tej Singh, a king of the Bundela Rajput who ruled Gingee from 1712-1714
 Tej Singh Prabhakar (1911–2009), the last ruling Maharaja of Alwar
 Tej Singh (politician), Indian politician and founder president of Ambedkar Samaj Party
 Tej P. Singh (born 1944), an Indian biophysicist 
 Tej Parkash Singh, Member of the Punjab Legislative Assembly (2002–2012)